Edgmond is a civil parish in the district of Telford and Wrekin, Shropshire, England.  It contains 24 listed buildings that are recorded in the National Heritage List for England.  Of these, one is listed at Grade I, the highest of the three grades, two are at Grade II*, the middle grade, and the others are at Grade II, the lowest grade.  The parish contains the village of Edgmond and the surrounding countryside.  Most of the listed buildings are houses and associated structures, farm houses and farm buildings.  The other listed buildings include a church, a former water mill, and a war memorial.


Key

Buildings

References

Citations

Sources

Lists of buildings and structures in Shropshire